Alipur is the administrative headquarters and a sub-division of North Delhi district in the state of Delhi, India. It is surrounded by the localities of Bawana, Narela, Budhpur, Bakoli and Mukhmelpur. Alipur comes under the Narela constituency. The nearest metro station is Jahangirpuri Metro Station. Alipur is situated on the Delhi-Amritsar National Highway 1. Sharad Chauhan is the present MLA of Narela constituency. Yogesh Rana is the present Nigam Parshad of Alipur.

Demographics
 India census, Alipur had a population of 16,623. Males constitute 58% of the population and females, 42%. It has an average literacy rate of 68%, higher than the national average of 59.5%; 63% for males and 37% for females. 15% of the population is below six years of age.

Education 
Alipur has many types of education with various government schools, public or private schools, colleges, university and institutions.

University 
Swami Sharadhanand College
DELHI UNIVERSITY

University 
AIIPPHS STATE GOVERNMENT
UNIVERSITY DELHI

College 
Swami Shraddhanand College

Govt. Schools 
Government Boys Senior Secondary School

Government Sarvodaya Girls Sr Sec School

Municipal Corporation Primary (Boys) Model School

Municipal Corporation Primary Model (Girls) School

ALL INDIA INSTITUTE OF OPEN SCHOOLING BOARD (AIIOS)

AIIOS OPEN SCHOOLING BOARD DELHI

Private Schools 

Rishikul Vidyapeeth

Sant Gyaneshwar Public School

Gyanodaya Model Public School

Gulzari Lal Public School

Institutions 

ALL INDIA INSTITUTE OF PUBLIC  & PHYSICAL HEALTH SCIENCES (AIIPPHS)

NATIONAL INSTITUTE OF EDUCATION DEVELOPMENT SOCIETY & SPORTS COUNCIL (NIEDSSC)

AIIPPHS INSTITUTE ALIPUR DELHI

SANITARY INSPECTOR DIPLOMA INSTITUTE DELHI

NIEDSSC SPORTS INSTITUTE ALIPUR DELHI

INTERNATIONAL SCOUT GUIDE & ADVENTURE ASSOCIATION (ISGAA)DELHI

INTERNATIONAL SCOUT GUIDE & ADVENTURE SPORTS COUNCIL (ISGASC) DELHI

WORLD CRICKET COUNCIL (WCC)

UNIQUE EDUCATIONAL WELFARE CENTRE, DELHI

Nist Computer Education

The Flow (Spoken English) Institute

Mahavir group of institutions (MGI)

Inspire Leading Education

American Institute of English Language

Rashtriya Sarv Shiksha Abhiyan

SC KDR Dance Academy

Classroom Coaching

Neighborhood Villages 

 BudhPur BijaPur
 Holambi Khurd
 Kham Pur
 Kureni
 Palla
 Bakhtawar Pur
 Bakoli
 Bhor Garh
 Hamid Pur
 Hiranki
 Holambi Kalan
 Khera Kalan
 Khera Khurd
 Zind Pur
 Taj Pur Kalan
 Tikri Khurd
 Shah Pur Garhi
 Mukhmel Pur
 Singhola
 Siras Pur
 Narela
 Singhu
 Kadipur

Places to visit 
 Khatu Shyam Delhi Dham
 Shri Sai Mandir
 Dayal Market
 AIIPPHS UNIVERSITY, DELHI
 Alipur City Forest
 Turning Point Foundation
 NATIONAL INSTITUTE OF EDUCATION DEVELOPMENT & SOCIETY SPORTS COUNCIL (NIEDSSC)
 ALL INDIA INSTITUTE OF PUBLIC & PHYSICAL HEALTH SCIENCES(AIIPPHS)
 ALL INDIA INSTITUTE OF OPEN SCHOOLING BOARD (AIIOS)
 WORLD CRICKET COUNCIL(WCC)
 NATIONAL UNIVERSITY SCHOOL & GAMES ASSOCIATION (NUSGA)
 INTERNATIONAL SCOUT GUIDE & ADVENTURE ASSOCIATION (ISGAA)
 INTERNATIONAL SCOUT GUIDE & ADVENTURE SPORTS COUNCIL(ISGASC)
 UNIQUE EDUCATION WELFARE CENTER (UEWC)
 Yoga Vatika
 Bada Shiv Mandir
 Budhe Baba Mandir
 Children Home Complex Alipur

References

External links 
 Alipur, Delhi at Wikimapia

Cities and towns in North West Delhi district
District subdivisions of Delhi